INS or Ins or variant, may refer to:

Places
 Ins, Switzerland, a municipality
 Creech Air Force Base (IATA airport code INS)
 Indonesia, ITF and UNDP code INS

Biology
Ins, a New World genus of bee flies
 INS, the gene for the insulin precursor

Arts, entertainment, and media
 Indian Newspaper Society
 International News Service, US, 1909–1958

Enterprises and organizations
 International Necronautical Society
 International Network Services Inc.
 International Neuroethics Society
 International Neuropsychological Society
 International Nuclear Services, UK

Government and politics
 Immigration and Naturalization Service, former US agency merged into DHS
 Institut National de la Statistique (disambiguation), statistics agencies in many Francophone countries
 National Institute of Statistics (Romania)

Naval
 Indian naval ship
 Israeli naval ship prefix

Technology
 <ins>...</ins> HTML block element indicating insertion
 Inertial navigation system
 Insert key marking on a computer keyboard

Other uses
 The abbreviated plural of inches
 International Numbering System for Food Additives, adopted by the Codex Alimentarius Commission

See also

 
 IN (disambiguation)